Edvin Ivanov (born July 25, 1970) is a Russian sprinter. He competed in the men's 200 metres at the 1992 Summer Olympics.

References

Russian male sprinters
1970 births
Living people
Athletes (track and field) at the 1992 Summer Olympics
Soviet male sprinters
Olympic athletes of the Unified Team
CIS Athletics Championships winners